Koovappady  is a village in Ernakulam district in the Indian state of Kerala.

Koovappady is around 8 km north to Perumbavoor and is near to Kodanadu elephant training centre. Other places of interest nearby include Kalady, the birthplace of Sankaracharya, and Malayattoor. Ganpati Vilasam High School is famous here.

Education Centre 

 Peniel Bible Seminary And Missionary Training Centre

Temples of Koovapaddy 

 Aimury Siva Temple famous for the great Nandi idol named Brihat Nandi.
 Cheranelloor Siva temple
 Ganapathy temple https://web.archive.org/web/20130603022438/http://koovappadymahaganapathytemple.org/
 Thottuva Sri Dhanwanthari Temple
 Pullamveli Kavu, Bhagavathy temple
 Kallarakkal Mahavishnu Mahadeva Temple
 Chelattu Sri Mookambika Temple
 Pisharickal Bhagavathy Temple
 Kottakkal Edmanakavu Bhagavathy Temple

Demographics
 India census, Koovappady had a population of 26525 with 13469 males and 13056 females.

References 

Neighbourhoods in Kochi